Eulepidotis ezra is a moth of the family Erebidae first described by Herbert Druce in 1898. It is found in the Neotropics, including Mexico and Costa Rica.

References

Moths described in 1898
ezra